Palaeorissoinidae is an extinct family of fossil snails, marine gastropod molluscs in the family Rissooidea.

References 

 The Taxonomicon